Lgeez are an Australian hip hop music duo formed by Alex Jones (from Melbourne) and Son of Sam (from Sydney) in 2014. Their debut album Cloud 9 was released in October the same year.

Career
Prior to 2014, Alex Jones used the rap aliases Flea and Dr. Flea. He released his first mixtape Blood Runs Deep in 2011. In 2012 he collaborated with DJ Will Sparks on the song 'Chemical Energy'.

Son of Sam (formerly known as SW, Jam Master Sam and sometimes referred to as Sunnah) released his debut mixtape Summer of Sam in December of 2012.

After the pair gained attention as solo performers on YouTube and SoundCloud they formed the duo Lgeez in 2014, and released their debut album Cloud 9. Cloud 9 peaked at #19 on the ARIA Hip-Hop/R&B Albums Chart.

Lgeez have been cited as influences by other Australian hip-hop artists, including Chillinit, HP Boyz, Indigomerkaba and Wombat. They have also received praise from rapper 360.

Discography

Studio albums

Extended plays

Mixtapes

Singles

As featured artist

References

Australian hip hop musicians
Australian male rappers
Rappers from Sydney
Rappers from Melbourne
Living people
1993 births